The Tamaulipan matorral is an ecoregion in the deserts and xeric shrublands biome on the eastern slopes of the Sierra Madre Oriental range in northeastern Mexico. It is a transitional ecoregion between the Tamaulipan mezquital and the Sierra Madre Oriental pine-oak forests to the west and the Veracruz moist forests to the south. 

The Tamaulipan matorral is a desert shrubland where the flora mainly consists of woody shrubs, small trees, cacti, and succulents. There are a number of resident bird species and the mammals include Mexican prairie dog, Saussure's shrew, yellow-faced pocket gopher, Allen's squirrel, collared peccary and coyote.

Setting
The Tamaulipan matorral extends along the eastern slopes of the Sierra Madre Oriental range in northeastern Mexico, extending from central Tamaulipas state across central Nuevo León. The humid Veracruz moist forests lie to the southeast, on the Gulf Coastal Plain of southern Tamaulipas and Veracruz states; the Tamaulipan mezquital lies in the Rio Grande lowlands to the east and northeast. The Sierra Madre Oriental pine-oak forests occupy higher elevations of the Sierra Madre Oriental range to the west.

Flora
The ecoregion is predominantly a desert shrubland made up of woody shrubs, small trees, cacti, and succulents. Dominant plant species include Cylindropuntia leptocaulis, Opuntia engelmannii var. lindheimeri, Prosopis juliflora, P. laevigata, Yucca treculeana, Salvia ballotiflora, Jatropha dioica, cenizo (Leucophyllum frutescens), Mammillaria heyderi hemisphaerica, tepeguaje (Leucaena pulverulenta) and Mimosa aculeaticarpa var. biuncifera. Piedmont scrub is found in shallow soils derived from sedimentary rocks at the base of the Sierra Madre (below ) and receives  of annual rainfall. It is composed of relatively short plants ( in height) such as Helietta parvifolia, Neopringlea integrifolia and Acacia spp. Montane chaparral is a distinct plant community found above  in the Sierra Madre Oriental, composed of oaks (Quercus spp.), Arbutus, Yucca, Cercocarpus, and Bauhinia.

Fauna
Mammals present in this ecoregion include the Mexican prairie dog (Cynomys mexicanus), Saussure's shrew (Sorex saussurei), yellow-faced pocket gopher (Pappogeomys castanops), Allen's squirrel (Sciurus alleni), collared peccary (Pecari tajacu) and coyote (Canis latrans). Birds such as the burrowing owl (Athene cunicularia), hooded oriole (Icterus cucullates), eastern meadowlark (Sturnella magna), long-billed thrasher (Toxostoma longirostre), hooded yellowthroat (Geothlypis nelsoni), blue bunting (Cyanocompsa parellina) and olive sparrow (Arremonops rufivirgatus) are resident.

Protected areas
6.15% of the ecoregion is in protected areas. Protected areas include Cumbres de Monterrey National Park, Cerro de la Silla Natural Monument, and the Cerro El Topo, Cerro La Mota, Parras de la Fuente, Sierra Cerro de la Silla, Sierra El Fraile y San Miguel, Sierra Las Mitras, and Sierra Picachos ecological conservation areas.

See also
 List of ecoregions in Mexico

References

External links
 
 

Deserts and xeric shrublands
Ecoregions of Mexico
Deserts of Mexico
 
 
 
Sierra Madre Oriental
Natural history of Nuevo León
Natural history of Tamaulipas
Nearctic ecoregions